This is the list of awards and nominations received by Paul van Dyk, whose career in electronic music both as a DJ, record producer and musician is over 20 years.

Amongst his major competitive achievements, Van Dyk has won one Grammy Award, 10 International Dance Music Award's, 18 Trance Awards, two DJ Mag Award's, one Mixmag Award and one DJ Awards. Overall in his career, to date, he has won 32 competitive awards from 67 nominations and has sold over three million albums worldwide.

Awards and nominations

DJ Awards
The DJ Awards organizes the annual electronic music DJ awards event it is the only international ceremony for DJs and also the oldest, the awards are held once a year at Pacha club in Ibiza Spain it is one of the most important accolades an artist can win or be honoured by.

Van Dyk won the Best Trance DJ Award in 2006 and alsoThe Trance Master Award on 2018 and has received a 16 nominations since the awards began in 1998.

|-
| 1999
|Paul van Dyk
|Best Techno DJ
| 
|-
| 2000
| Paul van Dyk
| Best Trance DJ
| 
|-
| 2001
|Paul van Dyk
|Best Trance DJ
| 
|-
| 2004
| Paul van Dyk
| Best Trance DJ
| 
|-
| 2005
|Paul van Dyk
|Best Trance DJ
| 
|-
| 2006
| Paul van Dyk
| Best Trance DJ
| 
|-
| 2008
|Paul van Dyk
|Best Trance DJ
| 
|-
| 2010
| Paul van Dyk
| Best Trance DJ
| 
|-
| 2010
|Paul van Dyk
|Best International DJ
| 
|-
| 2011
| Paul van Dyk
| Best Trance DJ
| 
|-
| 2012
|Paul van Dyk
|Best Trance DJ
| 
|-
| 2013
| Paul van Dyk
| Best Trance DJ
| 
|-
| 2015
| Paul van Dyk
| Best Trance DJ
| 
|-
| 2016
| Paul van Dyk
| Best Trance DJ
| 
|-
| 2018
| Paul van Dyk
| Best Trance DJ / Trance Master
| 
|-

DJ Magazine Awards
Artists are nominated to the DJ Magazine Top 100 DJ's list each year the public votes to decide who they rank as the World's No 1 DJ at the end of the poll. Van Dyk was ranked as the World's No 1 DJ in 2005 and 2006 he ranked in the top 5 for 7 years, the top 10 for 8 years and the top 20 for 10 years.

|-
| 1997
| Paul van Dyk
| World's Top 100 DJs
| style="text-align:center;"| 42
|-
| 1998
| Paul van Dyk
| World's Top 100 DJs
| style="text-align:center;"| 6
|-
| 1999
| Paul van Dyk
| World's Top 100 DJs
| style="text-align:center;"| 5
|-
| 2000
| Paul van Dyk
| World's Top 100 DJs
| style="text-align:center;"| 4
|-
| 2001
| Paul van Dyk
| World's Top 100 DJs
| style="text-align:center;"| 4
|-
| 2002
| Paul van Dyk
| World's Top 100 DJs
| style="text-align:center;"| 4
|-
| 2003
| Paul van Dyk
| World's Top 100 DJs
| 
|-
| 2004
| Paul van Dyk
| World's Top 100 DJs
| 
|-
| 2005
| Paul van Dyk
| World's Top 100 DJs
| 
|-
| 2006
| Paul van Dyk
| World's Top 100 DJs
| 
|-
| 2007
| Paul van Dyk
| World's Top 100 DJs
| style="text-align:center;"| 4
|-
| 2008
| Paul van Dyk
| World's Top 100 DJs
| 
|-
| 2009
| Paul van Dyk
| World's Top 100 DJs
| style="text-align:center;"| 5
|-
| 2010
| Paul van Dyk
| World's Top 100 DJs
| style="text-align:center;"| 6
|-
| 2011
| Paul van Dyk
| World's Top 100 DJs
| style="text-align:center;"| 11
|-
| 2012
| Paul van Dyk
| World's Top 100 DJs
| style="text-align:center;"| 16
|-
| 2013
| Paul van Dyk
| World's Top 100 DJs
| style="text-align:center;"| 32
|-
| 2014
| Paul van Dyk
| World's Top 100 DJs
| style="text-align:center;"| 38
|-
| 2015
| Paul van Dyk
| World's Top 100 DJs
| style="text-align:center;"| 41
|-
| 2016
| Paul van Dyk
| World's Top 100 DJs
| style="text-align:center;"| 60
|-
| 2017
| Paul van Dyk
| World's Top 100 DJs
| style="text-align:center;"| 51
|-
| 2018
| Paul van Dyk
| World's Top 100 DJs
| style="text-align:center;"| 55
|-
| 2019
| Paul van Dyk
| World's Top 100 DJs
| style="text-align:center;"| 87
|-
| 2020
| Paul van Dyk
| World's Top 100 DJs
| style="text-align:center;"| 50
|-
| 2021
| Paul van Dyk
| World's Top 100 DJs
| style="text-align:center;"| 41
|-
| 2022
| Paul van Dyk
| World's Top 100 DJs
| style="text-align:center;"| 38

Grammy Awards 
The Grammy Awards(originally called Gramophone Award), or Grammy, is an accolade by the National Academy of Recording Arts and Sciences (NARAS) of the United States to recognize outstanding achievement in the music industry. Paul van Dyk has received 1 award and 2 nominations overall.

|-
| 2005
| Paul van Dyk
| Best Dance/Electronic album "Reflections"
| 
|-
| 2008
| Paul van Dyk
| Best Soundtrack in a Motion Picture "The Dark Knight" 
| 
|-

International Dance Music Awards
The IDMA is a major event which is part of the Winter Music Conference (WMC) a weeklong electronic music conference, held every March since 1985 in Miami Beach, Florida, United States. Paul van Dyk has won 10 awards and been nominated 32 times.

|-
| 2002
| Paul van Dyk
| Best European DJ
| 
|-
| 2002
| Paul van Dyk
| Best Global DJ
| 
|-
| 2003
| Paul van Dyk
| Best European DJ
| 
|-
| 2003
| Paul van Dyk
| Best Global DJ
| 
|-
| 2004
| Paul van Dyk
| Best Track House Progressive/Trance: Nothing But You 
| 
|-
| 2004
| Paul van Dyk
| Best Global DJ
| 
|-
| 2005
| Paul van Dyk
| Best HI NRG/Euro Track: The Other Side
| 
|-
| 2005
| Paul van Dyk
| Best Global DJ
| 
|-
| 2005
| Paul van Dyk
| Best Dance Video: The Other Side
| 
|-
| 2005
| Paul van Dyk
| Best Full Length DJ Mix CD: The Politics of Dancing Vol. 2
| 
|-
| 2006
| Paul van Dyk
| Best European DJ
| 
|-
| 2006
| Paul van Dyk
| Best Global DJ
| 
|-
| 2007
| Paul van Dyk
| Best Progressive House/Trance Track:Let Go (Mute)
| 
|-
| 2007
| Paul van Dyk
| Best European DJ
| 
|-
| 2007
| Paul van Dyk
| Best Global DJ
| 
|-
| 2007
| Paul van Dyk
| Best Full Length DJ Mix CD: In Between
| 
|-
| 2007
| Paul van Dyk
| Best Producer
| 
|-
| 2008
| Paul van Dyk
| Best European DJ
| 
|-
| 2008
| Paul van Dyk
| Best Global DJ
| 
|-
| 2008
| Paul van Dyk
| Best Full Length DJ Mix CD: Cream Ibiza (New State UK)
| 
|-
| 2008
| Paul van Dyk
| Best Producer
| 
|-
| 2009
| Paul van Dyk
| Best European DJ
| 
|-
| 2009
| Paul van Dyk
| Best Global DJ
| 
|-
| 2009
| Paul van Dyk
| Best Full Length DJ Mix CD: VONYC Sessions 09 (Vandit Records)
| 
|-
| 2010
| Paul van Dyk
| Best European DJ
| 
|-
| 2010
| Paul van Dyk
| Best Global DJ
| 
|-
| 2010
| Paul van Dyk: VONYC Sessions 
| Best Podcast
| 
|-
| 2011
| Paul van Dyk
| Best European DJ
| 
|-
| 2011
| Paul van Dyk: VONYC Sessions 
| Best Podcast
| 
|-
| 2012
| Paul van Dyk
| Best Trance Track:The Ocean (Arty)
| 
|-
| 2012
| Paul van Dyk: VONYC Sessions 
| Best Podcast
| 
|-
| 2014
| Paul van Dyk
| Best Trance DJ
| 
|-

Mixmag Awards
In 2004 Mixmag selected nominations for the title of their first 'Worlds No1 DJ'' award poll the results of the public vote ranked Paul van Dyk 1st in 2005.

|-
| 2005
| Paul Van Dyk
| Worlds No 1 DJ
|

Trance Awards
Paul van Dyk has won a total of 18 Awards at this event.

|-
| 2005
| Paul van Dyk
| Best Producer
|  
|-
| 2005
| Paul van Dyk
| Best Global DJ
|  
|-
| 2006
| Paul van Dyk
| Best Global DJ
|  
|-
| 2006
| Paul van Dyk
| Best Producer
|  
|-
| 2007
| Paul van Dyk
| Best Global DJ
|  
|-
| 2007
| Paul van Dyk
| Best Producer
|  
|-
| 2007
| Paul van Dyk
| Best Label "VANDIT"
|  
|-
| 2007
| Paul van Dyk
| Best Remixer
|  
|-
| 2007
| Paul van Dyk
| Best Live Act
|  
|-
| 2007
| Paul van Dyk
| Best Album "In Between"
|  
|-
| 2007
| Paul van Dyk
| Best Radio Show "VONYC"
|  
|-
| 2007
| Paul van Dyk
| Best Website
|  
|-
| 2008
| Paul van Dyk
| Best Trance DJ
|  
|-
| 2008
| Paul van Dyk
| Best Producer
|  
|-
| 2008
| Paul van Dyk
| Best Label "VANDIT"
|  
|-
| 2009
| Paul van Dyk
| Best Trance DJ
|  
|-
| 2009
| Paul van Dyk
| Best Producer
|  
|-
| 2009
| Paul van Dyk
| Best Trance Track "Feat Johnny McDaid – Home" 
|  
|-

References

External links

 Official website
 
 Artist Site at Ultra Records

Van Dyk, Paul